HNLMS Evertsen (F805) (Dutch: Zr.Ms. Evertsen) is the fourth  of the Royal Netherlands Navy.

Service history
Evertsen visited South Africa in late 2007 as part of a NATO task force on a friendship visit. From February till June 2008 she was patrolling the Somali waters for the World Food Programme. The ship was back in these same waters in 2009 for Operation Atalanta. In early December 2009, she was involved in the capture of a group of Somali pirates, who had allegedly attacked the merchant ship .

In 2014, Commander Jos Oppeneer became HNLMS Evertsens commanding officer.

In October 2020, the ship served a defensive role as part of the HMS Queen Elizabeth Task Group for GROUPEX and Joint Warrior Exercises. She became one of eight ships escorting the British aircraft carrier, including six other Royal Navy vessels and the US destroyer USS The Sullivans. In a statement, Commanding Officer Cdr Rick Ongering praised the close and long-standing relationship between both navies.

In 2021, Evertsen joined UK Carrier Strike Group 21 on a deployment to the Asia-Pacific. The aircraft carrier was also accompanied by six British ships, a British submarine and an American destroyer. The ships sailed from Portmouth to the Mediterranean Sea, where an exercise followed with the fleet of the French aircraft carrier . The strike group crossed the South China Sea to Japan via the Suez Canal, India and Singapore. A number of ships, including Evertsen, made an interim visit to the Black Sea. During the visit to the Black Sea, Russian jets conducted mock attacks on the frigate.

Gallery

See also
 APAR
 SMART-L

References

De Zeven Provinciën-class frigates
Frigates of the Netherlands
2003 ships
Ships built in Vlissingen